USS Perch (SS-176) - a Porpoise-class submarine, was the first ship of the United States Navy to be named for the perch.

Her keel was laid down on 25 February 1935 by the Electric Boat Company, in Groton, Connecticut. She was launched on 9 May 1936.  She was sponsored by Mrs. Helen Lorena Withers (née LaBar), wife of Captain (later Admiral) Thomas Withers, Jr., then assigned to the New Groton Submarine Base, and commissioned on 19 November 1936.

Service history

Inter-war period
After shakedown in the North Atlantic, Perch became a member of the Pacific Fleet when she joined Submarine Squadron 6 (SubRon 6) in November 1937. The following spring she was engaged in the annual fleet problem and did some work on a survey of the Aleutian Islands, entering the Bering Sea on 28 February. In the spring of 1939, Perch operated with the fleet on its cruise to the East Coast.

In October 1939, Perch departed San Diego, California, for Manila where she became a division flagship and made a summer cruise in 1940 to Tsingtao and Shanghai. She spent the year preceding the war in operations around the Philippines. A week before Japan's attack on Pearl Harbor, Perch rendezvoused with two transports off Shanghai and escorted the Fourth Marines from China to the Philippines.

World War II
At the outbreak of hostilities, Perch, commanded by David A. Hurt, was in Cavite Navy Yard. She took part in the rush to clear the Navy Yard on 10 December and watched, at close range, the destruction of Cavite by bombers. That night, Perch slipped through the Corregidor minefields and scouted between Luzon and Formosa (Taiwan) in search of targets. Failing to detect any, she shifted to an area off Hong Kong, and on Christmas night, launched four torpedoes at a large merchantman, all missing. A few days later, she torpedoed a merchantman, probably . Japanese escorts prevented Perch from observing the kill.

Perch sailed south to Darwin, Australia, to repair damage, making several unsuccessful attacks en route. She next made a patrol to Kendari, Celebes (Sulawesi), where she scouted the harbor and made several attempts to get through the narrow entrance to an attack position.

After a week of close contact with the Japanese, obtaining information, Perch headed south searching for targets. In a night attack on a large merchantman off the eastern coast of Celebes, Perch was hit in the superstructure, forward of the pressure hull of the conning tower, by a high explosive round which blew away the bridge deck, punctured the antenna trunk and temporarily put her radio out of commission. Her crew made repairs on deck at night in waters heavily patrolled by the Japanese, and Perch headed for the Java Sea.

Several more depth charge attacks caused extensive damage, putting the starboard motors out of commission and causing extensive flooding throughout the boat. After repairs, Perch surfaced at 02:00, only to be again driven down by destroyers. The loss of oil, and air from damaged ballast tanks, convinced the Japanese that Perch was breaking up and they went on to look for other kills, allowing her to escape.

With decks awash and only one engine in commission, the crew made all possible repairs. During the early morning of 3 March, a test dive was made with almost fatal results. Expert handling and good luck enabled her to surface, and she began making repairs. Then, as if this was not enough, two Japanese cruisers and three destroyers hove into view and began firing. As shells straddled the boat, her skipper ordered, "Abandon ship, scuttle the boat." With all hull openings open, Perch made her last dive. She was stricken from the Naval Vessel Register 24 June 1942.

The entire crew was captured by the Japanese destroyer . Of the fifty-four men and five officers, all but five — who died of malnutrition in Japanese prisoner-of-war camps — were able to return to the United States after V-J Day.

Wreck
The expedition had hoped to locate and photograph the wreck of  Exeter, sunk in the same area on 1 March 1942. The wreck of Perch was illegally salvaged sometime between 2006 and 2016 and no longer exists. Unlike the Dutch and British ships near her which were also illegally scavenged, Perch was not a war grave as it had been abandoned by the crew during battle without fatalities.

Awards
 Asiatic-Pacific Campaign Medal with one battle star for World War II service

Lieutenant Kenneth G. Schacht was awarded a Navy Cross for assisting in the scuttling of the submarine and therefore preventing the Japanese from capturing classified code books, materials, and equipment.

In media
Perch is the subject of an episode of the syndicated television anthology series The Silent Service, which aired during the 1957–1958 season.

References

Further reading

External links
On Eternal Patrol: USS Perch

United States Porpoise-class submarines
World War II submarines of the United States
Lost submarines of the United States
Ships built in Groton, Connecticut
World War II shipwrecks in the Java Sea
1936 ships
Maritime incidents in March 1942
Submarines sunk by Japanese warships